The Astana Economic Forum (AEF) is an international and regional platform for dialogue and a nonprofit organization headquartered in Nur-Sultan, Kazakhstan. It was organized by the Eurasian Economic Club of Scientists Association and the Government of Kazakhstan in 2008. After a decade the forum is taking on an additional name – The Global Challenges Summit – to reflect the topics and draw of attendees from around the world. Since 2015 the Forum is organized by the Economic Initiatives Fund of Kazakhstan, which is a part of the Economic Research Institute under the Ministry of National Economy. A meeting is held each year in Nur-Sultan in which more than eight thousand delegates from one hundred countries are brought together: They include chief executive officers of businesses, politicians, journalists, scientists and Nobel Prize laureates.

Overview

History
The Astana Economic Forum traces its roots to a proposal for a series of Eurasian integration initiatives made in a 1994 speech at Moscow State University by Kazakhstan President Nursultan Nazarbayev. In June 2007, Nazarbayev suggested creating a Eurasian Club of Scientists to help with the economic integration of the Eurasian community and to develop international economic cooperation. The Eurasian Economic Club of Scientists Association was established on June 27, 2008, by Kazakhstan's Ministry of Economy and Budget Planning and the Economic Research Institute.

Organizers
The Astana Economic Forum is mainly organized by the Economic Initiatives Fund of Kazakhstan, Economic Research Institute and Government of Kazakhstan including 13 Ministries, the National Bank of Kazakhstan etc. Several countries and different organizations—such as the United Nations, National Welfare Fund Samruk-Kazyna, National Management Holding Baiterek, Reinventing Bretton-Woods Committee, UN, – aid Astana economic forum in organizing the events each year.

Activities

Annual meetings

The Astana Economic Forum is held annually in Nur-Sultan, Kazakhstan. Its recommendations are presented each year to a G-20 Summit.

 The first  dialogue was held on June 28, 2008, when the forum focused on topics regarding modern aspects of economic development under the conditions of globalization, macroeconomic regulation of the economy, globalization and the global competitiveness of the countries of Eurasia. The dialogue was attended by 100 leading scientists, prominent political leaders, entrepreneurs from over 40 countries. International organizations such as the United Nations, International Union of Economists, and European Economic Community also participated in the forum. Topics such as modern economics, economic development, economic stability and security, and Eurasian integration processes were discussed.
 The second dialogue took place on March 11 and 12, 2009, when the forum focused on the economic security of Eurasia in the system of global risks. The recommendations of the forum were submitted to the 2009 G-20 London Summit  in April 2009. The forum was attended by Nobel laureates  Robert Mundell and Edmund Phelps, President Ahmad Muhammad Ali of the Islamic Bank of Development, the European Bank for Reconstruction and Development's former President Jean Lemier, officials of the United Nations and others.
 During the third dialogue,  July 1 and  2, 2010, the forum focused on the theme of "crisis lessons and post-crisis model of economic development in globalization conditions," which included topics on public-private partnerships, development of innovative economy and other issues. Topics on energy efficiency and developing renewable energy were also discussed.
 The fourth dialogue, on May 3 and 4, 2011, focused on identifying new ways to develop the world's economy in three key trends: global economy and finance; business and investment; and economy and stable social development. Topics such as green economic development and environmental management were also included. People from different fields, coming from more than eighty countries, participated. Notable attendees were former President Stjepan Mesić of Croatia, former President Jorge Quiroga of Bolivia, former Prime Minister Jean Chrétien of Canada and others. International organizations, including the Food and Agriculture Organization and the Club de Madrid, were also represented.
 The fifth dialogue took place from May 22 to 24, 2012. More than eight thousand delegates from one hundred different countries and international organizations attended. The agenda of the forum included discussion about reforming the world monetary system, food security, tourism development, alternative energy, implementation of innovation and attraction of investment. The Secretary-General of the United Nations, Ban Ki-moon, stressed the need for the world leaders to take action at the upcoming United Nations Conference on Sustainable Development in addressing the varied global issues.
 The sixth dialogue was held from May 22 to 24, 2013. Over 10,000 participants attended the Forum, including representatives of international institutions (UN, IMF, WB, ADB, EBRD, etc.), government officials with huge managerial experience, leading scientists, Nobel Laureates, representatives of political, expert and the business communities. The presentation of the Astana Economic Forum was held in the historical center of the Financial District of New York – Wall Street on April 10, 2014. A unique Kazakhstani project was presented to the heads of international financial and investment companies, as well as experts of world stock exchanges.
 The VII Astana Economic Forum and the II World Anti-Crisis Conference will be held on May 21–23, 2014; this year these events will be dedicated to the 70th anniversary of the Bretton Woods agreement.
 The VIII Astana Economic Forum was held on May 21–22, 2015. The theme of the VIII AEF was "Infrastructure – a Driver of Economic Development." The 1st day of the forum was dedicated to Africa and was titled "Africa – the Next Driver of the Global Economy". Kazakhstan Minister of Foreign Affairs Erlan Idrissov noted: "A few years ago we started turning a keen eye on Africa. We believe it is a historic time when Africa should receive a full focus". Global co-organizers and partners of Astana Economic Forum 2015 included such organizations as the UN, OSCE, WEF, IMF, World Bank, UNDP and OECD.
 The IX Astana Economic Forum took place on May 25–26, 2016. The main topic of the IX Forum is New Economic Reality: diversification, innovation and knowledge economy. The Great Silk Road forum will be held as a part of the XIX Astana Economic Forum. The IMF plans held its Regional Conference within the framework of the XIX Astana Economic Forum. The IMF Managing Director Christine Lagarde attended the Conference during her first-ever visit to Kazakhstan and the region.
 The X Astana Economic Forum took place on June 15–16, 2017. The main topic of the meeting is New Energy – New Economy. During the Forum issues of sustainable economic growth, international trade and innovation will be discussed. The Forum will mark 25th anniversary of cooperation between Kazakhstan and the World Bank, as well as other events such as the Economist Innovation Forum, panel sessions organized by Boao Forum for Asia, UNDP, SAP, BCG, etc.
 The XI Astana Economic Forum and Global Challenges Summit took place on 17–18 May 2018. The main topics are Unified Economy, Global Strategy, Urbanization and Sustainability. Speakers at the 2018 forum include former French president François Hollande, former Italian prime minister Romano Prodi, 8th UN secretary-general Ban Ki-Moon, futurologist Michio Kaku, and Apple co-founder Steve Wozniak.
 The XII Astana Economic Forum was held in Nur-Sultan on May 16–17, 2019. The theme of the forum was "Inspiring growth: people, cities, economies." 5,500 delegates from 74 countries participated in the event that comprised more than 50 sessions on topical global issues. The third annual Kazakhstan Global Investment Roundtable (KGIR-2019) was held as part of the XII Astana Economic Forum. At the KGIR-2019, international investors and Kazakh companies signed 43 agreements totalling $8.7 billion.

See also
 Global economic conferences
 G-20 Summit
 The city of Nur-Sultan

References

External links

Official websites
 Astana Economic Forum Official Website
 Astana Economic Forum Official Blog
 Astana Economic Forum Archive Website
 Eurasian Economic Club of Scientists Official Website

Social networks
 Astana Economic Forum on Facebook
 Astana Economic Forum on Twitter
 Astana Economic Forum on YouTube

Global economic conferences
Organizations based in Astana
21st-century economic history
Organizations established in 2008
Diplomatic conferences in Kazakhstan